"Flawless" (stylized as "Flawlëss") is a song by American rapper Yeat featuring fellow American rapper Lil Uzi Vert. Produced by BNYX, it was released as the opening track from Yeat's sixth extended play Lyfe (2022).

Composition
The song begins with audio sampled from a video by internet comedian sharedatbitchlikeapizza, who is heard talking about his accessories that are literally made from dollar bills. In the chorus, Yeat raps about the products he buys with his wealth. The song only has one verse, performed by Lil Uzi Vert, who name-drops numerous brands that they have bought from, briefly shouts out producer Maaly Raw, and laments about the untrustworthy people around them.

Critical reception
Alexander Cole of HotNewHipHop gave a positive review, writing, "In the end, both artists delivered on a high level as we were provided with a banger called “Flawless” that will go off at any festival or party. As you will hear, the track features some ominous vocals in the background, while YEAT delivers a chorus about his extravagant lifestyle. Uzi has a long verse in the middle of the track and it features one of [their] best flows yet. The two make a great team and this track".

Charts

References

2022 songs
Yeat songs
Lil Uzi Vert songs
Songs written by Lil Uzi Vert